Clifton Community School is a secondary school located in Rotherham, South Yorkshire,  England. It is situated on Middle Lane and receives children from a number of primary schools throughout Rotherham.

Clifton is a secondary school serving school years from 7 - 11, with number of pupils on the school roll at 1,009. It is mixed gender and serves pupils aged between 11 – 16.  In January 2014 Clifton Community School entered into a partnership with Wickersley School and Sports College.

History
Clifton first started at Rotherham Girls' High School which was a grammar school. Rotherham Girls' Grammar School was established and was dominated by Rotherham Corporation in 1906.
Rotherham Girls' High School was moved to Middle Lane, Rotherham. After being taken over by Rotherham Corporation in 1906, 67 Years later it closed down in 1973, with Mrs Ridge still being Headmistress at that time. In September 1973, Rotherham Girls' Grammar School changed to a comprehensive school and was opened as Clifton Comprehensive School in the same building. Mrs Ridge was the first Headmistress of the new Clifton Comprehensive School.

In 1991 Clifton Comprehensive School was divided into the Lower School and Upper School, at separate locations, while incorporating the former Spurley Hey school.

In September 2004 Clifton Comprehensive School was specialized into an "Arts College" and was renamed to "Clifton: A Community Arts School".

In January 2014 "Clifton: A Community Arts School", changed its name to "Clifton Community School". This is the now the present name of the school, linking also with the new January 2014 logo as the school's official new logo.

Clifton became an academy, sponsored by Wickersley Partnership Trust, on 1 December 2017.

Ofsted inspections
Since the commencement of Ofsted inspections in September 1993, the school has undergone seven inspections:

Headteachers
 1973 – 1974: Mrs Ridge (continuing on from Rotherham Girls' High School to Clifton Comprehensive School) 
 1974 - 1982: Mr Bates
 1983 – 1989: Mr Deeley
 1989 – 1995: Mr Light
 1995 – 2005: Mr Marshall
 2005 – 2014: Mr Daley
 2014 – 2021: Mr Hardcastle
 2021 – present: Mrs Leng

Feeder schools
The school receives a notable number of students from Herringthorpe Junior School, Badsley Moor Junior School, Saint Ann's Junior School, East Dene Primary School and a number of other schools around the central Rotherham area.

Progression to further education
As Clifton does not have its own sixth form, the majority of Clifton students embark on their post-16 education at the neighbouring Thomas Rotherham College for academic courses or Rotherham College of Arts and Technology.

References

External links
 Clifton Community School

Educational institutions established in 1973
1973 establishments in England
Academies in Rotherham
Secondary schools in Rotherham